The 2017 Slovenian FIM Speedway Grand Prix was the opening race of the 2017 Speedway Grand Prix season. It took place on April 29 at the Matija Gubec Stadium in Krško, Slovenia.

Riders 
The Speedway Grand Prix Commission nominated Nick Škorja as the wild card, and Matic Ivačič and Denis Štojs both as Track Reserves.

Results 
The Grand Prix was won by Martin Vaculík, who beat Fredrik Lindgren, Patryk Dudek and Jason Doyle in the final. Emil Sayfutdinov had initially top scored on the night, but was eliminated in the semi-finals.

Heat details

Intermediate classification

References

See also 
 motorcycle speedway

Slovenia
Speedway Grand Prix
Krško
2017 in Slovenian sport
Speedway Grand Prix of Slovenia